The Baffin coastal tundra is a small ecoregion of the far north of North America, on the central north coast of Baffin Island in the Canadian territory of Nunavut. This is permafrost tundra with an average annual temperature below freezing.

Setting
This ecoregion is a small stretch of coastal plain on the north coast of Baffin Island. The coast is rocky with many fjords carved by glaciers into the Baffin Mountains. The cold Arctic climate consists of a short summers (mean temperature 1°C) and a long, cold winter (mean temperature -22.5°C).

Flora
The plant cover is sparse in the drier areas while the wetter areas have a fair cover of mosses, sedges, shrubs such as purple saxifrage, Arctic willow, and Arctic poppy and rushes.

Fauna
This coast is a breeding area for the snow bunting and is home to polar bear, Arctic hare, Arctic fox, lemming, and caribou.

Threats and preservation
This ecoregion is almost intact although there are no protected areas.

See also
List of ecoregions in Canada (WWF)

References

Ecoregions of Canada
02
Nearctic ecoregions
Tundra ecoregions